Marjetka Jeršek is a Slovenian novelist.

Works
	Teden dni do polne lune (1988)
	Dišave ognja (1989)
	Smaragdno mesto (1991)
	Kariatidino srce (1992)
	Vetru sprememb (1995)
	Svet čarovnije besed (1996)
	Akvamarinski prehod (1997)
	Eliksir (2000)
	Knjiga urokov (2000)
	Energija videnja (2001)
	KanDeLar (2002)
	KanDeLar Dve (2004)
	Viši so vilinske miši (2007)
	Totemske živali (2007)
      Princ zelenih sanj (2007)
	Nirulan (2007)
	Čari pisav (2007)
	KanDeLar – ponatis (2008)
	Aoraum (2010)
 Vetra Naliv in Knjiga strupov (2016) (source: NUK)
 Imenitnost spremembe - založba Stella (source: NUK)
 Zapiski o Parasvetu: založba Stella (source: NUK)
 V objemu povezav (2000) (source:NUK)

References

Slovenian novelists
Living people
Date of birth missing (living people)
Year of birth missing (living people)